André Adrien Hippolyte Prévost  (26 March 1860 – 15 February 1919) was, a tennis player competing for France. He finished runner-up to Paul Aymé in the singles event of the Amateur French Championships in 1900. Prévost also competed in the 1900 Summer Olympics in Paris, where he and Georges de la Chapelle shared the bronze medal with Harold Mahony and Arthur Norris in the men's doubles event. His relative, Yvonne, won silver in the women's singles.

Grand Slam finals

Singles: 1 (0–1)

References

External links
 

1860 births
1919 deaths
French male tennis players
Olympic medalists in tennis
Olympic tennis players of France
Tennis players at the 1900 Summer Olympics
Olympic bronze medalists for France
Medalists at the 1900 Summer Olympics
Tennis players from Paris